Shlomo Riskin (born May 28, 1940) is an Orthodox rabbi, and the founding rabbi of Lincoln Square Synagogue on the Upper West Side of New York City, which he led for 20 years; founding chief rabbi of the Israeli settlement of Efrat in the Israeli-occupied West Bank; dean of Manhattan Day School in New York City; and founder and Chancellor of the Ohr Torah Stone Institutions, a network of high schools, colleges, and graduate Programs in the United States and Israel.

Early career
Shlomo Riskin was born on May 28, 1940, in Brooklyn, New York. He attended the Yeshiva of Brooklyn, and graduated valedictorian, summa cum laude, from Yeshiva University in 1960, where he received rabbinic ordination under the guidance of Rabbi Joseph Soloveitchik. In 1963, Riskin received his master's degree in Jewish history, and he completed a Ph.D from New York University in 1982. From 1963 until 1977, he lectured and served as an Associate Professor of Tanakh and Talmud at Yeshiva University in New York City.

At the age of 23, Riskin became the founding rabbi of Lincoln Square Synagogue in New York City and served in that position until 1983. With the full backing of his mentor, Rabbi Joseph B. Soloveitchik, Rabbi Riskin transformed a fledgling Conservative minyan into one of New York's most innovative and dynamic Orthodox communities. The synagogue became particularly well known for its pioneering outreach programs which inspired many secular people to become religiously observant Orthodox Jews.

During the 1960s and 1970s, he became a leader of the movement to allow free, unfettered emigration for persecuted Soviet Jews and made several trips to visit and strengthen the Jewish communities in the then USSR. He was the chairman of Student Struggle for Soviet Jewry, the first American national movement to free Russian Jews.

Immigration and after
In 1983, Riskin immigrated to the Israeli settlement of Efrat in the Israeli-occupied West Bank with his family, where he became the founding Chief Rabbi, a position he still holds. Over the years, he was joined by many former members of his New York congregation. In Israel, Riskin has established a network of high schools, colleges, graduate programs, seminaries and rabbinical schools under the name Ohr Torah Stone Institutions with a total student enrollment numbering in the thousands.

Riskin has dedicated himself to training a new generation of leaders for the Orthodox Jewish world. To this end, he established a Rabbinical Seminary and Practical Rabbinics Program to prepare young men with the scholarship and practical skills to become effective spiritual leaders, teachers and spokesmen for Orthodox Judaism. Riskin now has hundreds of former students serving as rabbis and educators in Israel and throughout the world.

He has also pioneered the rights of women in the world of Orthodox Judaism. He broadened women's participation in public religious practices, and declared that women could hold their own celebration of Simhat Torah. He co-founded a women's college, Midreshet Lindenbaum (originally named Michlelet Bruria), a prominent seminary for Orthodox women. In 2014, the first-ever book of halachic decisions written by women who were ordained to serve as poskim (Idit Bartov and Anat Novoselsky) was published. The women were ordained by Riskin, after completing Midreshet Lindenbaum women's college five-year ordination course in advanced studies in Jewish law, as well as passing examinations equivalent to the rabbinate's requirement for men. In addition, in 2021 he supported the appointment of an additional graduate of this program Rabbanit Shira Marili Mirvis as the spiritual leader of the Shirat HaTamar synagogue in Efrat. Marili Mirvis is the first women to serve as the sole leader of an Orthodox congregation in Israel.

In 1991, Riskin issued a challenge in Israel's High Court to the laws which prevented women from serving as Toanot - advocates in the Rabbinical Court. Riskin won the case and established the first program for the training of women advocates in the religious courts. Graduates of the program now defend the rights of Agunot (women whose husbands refuse to grant them a divorce) in the religious courts, helping them to secure a Get (bill of religious divorce). Riskin is an advocate of prenuptial agreements as a solution for the problem of recalcitrant husbands.

Parallel to these institutions, Riskin also established the first ever programs for young men and women from the Diaspora with severe learning and developmental difficulties to spend a year studying Torah in Israel while also gaining vocational training.

Riskin is a forceful spokesperson for Jews and Israel, and against anti-Semitism and anti-Zionism. As an advocate of religious and cultural tolerance, he has worked to promote good relations with the leaders of the Palestinian villages surrounding the Efrat settlement.

In 2008, Riskin established the Center for Jewish–Christian Understanding and Cooperation, or CJCUC, the first Orthodox Jewish institution to dialogue with the Christian world on a religious and theological basis. The center, currently located in Jerusalem, engages in Hebraic Bible Study for Christians, from both the local community and from abroad, has organized numerous interfaith praise initiatives, such as Day to Praise, and has established many fund-raising initiatives such as Blessing Bethlehem which aim to aid the persecuted Christian community of Bethlehem, in part, and the larger persecuted Christian community of the Middle East region and throughout the world. Since Riskin's retirement as president of Ohr Torah Stone in 2018, the overseeing of all CJCUC activities has been turned over to David Nekrutman who has served as the center's chief director since its inception.

In 2018, Riskin was awarded the Bonei Zion (Builders of Zion) Prize for outstanding achievements in Education.

Controversy

Rabbi Riskin's term as Chief Rabbi of Efrat was extended by five years on June 28, 2015, after a month-long controversy in which the Chief Rabbinate was allegedly planning to retire him at age 75 because of his religious views on the advancement of women in Orthodoxy and an inclusive approach towards conversion.

Rabbi Riskin was accused of comparing U.S. President Barack Obama to the antagonist of the Book of Esther, Haman, in a March 28, 2015, speech in the Grand Synagogue in Jerusalem.

In April 2015, Riskin's launching of the Day to Praise interfaith joint praise initiative caused an uproar within the Haredi and other conservative-Orthodox Jewish circles. In a statement, the once chief Sephardi Rabbi of Israel, and the chief Rabbi of Jerusalem, Rabbi Shlomo Amar, expressed his "stomach churning" in light of the joint Hallel prayer of Jews and Christians in a synagogue in Jerusalem being led by Rabbi Riskin. In a rebuttal, Rabbi Riskin defended his actions, stating that, "We are talking about a thanksgiving prayer to G-d that would include Christians who worship His actions towards the Jewish people and the Land of Israel... What could possibly be more appropriate?". Later that year, in September, on the eve of Rosh HaShana (The beginning of the Jewish New Year), Riskin's claim was given further backing by Rabbi Pesach Wolicki. In an article written for The Times of Israel, Wolicki wrote: "While discomfort is understandable, we dare not assume that what is uncomfortable and new is therefore forbidden."

In 2010, Riskin appeared in a video where he referenced Jesus with a title of Rabbi, and called Jesus a "model Rabbi", referring to the historical origins of Jesus as a Jew, and not of the modern perception of Jesus. Many took Riskin's statements out of context, claiming that Riskin's statements are incompatible with mainstream theologies in other forms of Judaism. Riskin explained in an additional statement that a poor edit to the video left out his explanation elaborating upon the fundamental differences between the religions, and the historical context within which his statements were made.

Bibliography
 (with Alan W. Miller and Sheldon Zimmerman)

See also
Efrat
Ohr Torah Stone
Yeshivat Hamivtar
Center for Jewish-Christian Understanding and Cooperation (CJCUC)
Day to Praise

References

External links

Ohr Torah Stone biography of Shlomo Riskin
Urim Publications biography of Shlomo Riskin
Ohr Torah Stone
Lincoln Square Synagogue
Koren Publishers Jerusalem

1940 births
Israeli Modern Orthodox rabbis
Religious Zionist Orthodox rabbis
Living people
Baalei teshuva
Rabbi Isaac Elchanan Theological Seminary semikhah recipients
New York University alumni
American emigrants to Israel
American Orthodox rabbis
Israeli settlers
Yeshiva University alumni
Christian and Jewish interfaith dialogue
Bonei Zion Prize recipients
People from Brooklyn
Clergy from New York City
20th-century American rabbis
21st-century American rabbis